Francis Baker (5 December 1847 – 15 April 1901) was an English cricketer. A left-handed batsman born in Cirencester, Gloucestershire, Baker's career in first-class cricket spanned eight matches for the Marylebone Cricket Club, Gloucestershire County Cricket Club, and two Gentlemen's teams between 1866 and 1875. He scored 199 runs in these matches, with a batting average of 15.30. His best innings, a score of 53, came against Surrey on 4 June 1868, while playing for the MCC. In other cricket, he played over two-dozen matches for Cheltenham College – his alma mater – and the Free Foresters Cricket Club.

References

External links

1847 births
1901 deaths
People from Cirencester
English cricketers
Gloucestershire cricketers
Marylebone Cricket Club cricketers
Gentlemen of the South cricketers
Gentlemen of the North cricketers
People educated at Cheltenham College
Cricketers from Gloucestershire